Stephen Jude Quinn (born 1 April 1986) is an Irish professional footballer who plays as a midfielder for Mansfield Town. He has also represented the Republic of Ireland national team.

He started his career with League of Ireland club St Patrick's Athletic before moving to Sheffield United in 2005. Quinn made over 200 appearances for the Blades, being their player of the season in 2011 and being in the Football League One PFA Team of the Year 2011–12. In 2012, he moved to Hull City and was a part of the team that won promotion back to the Premier League. Quinn also started the 2014 FA Cup Final against Arsenal. He is known for his set piece taking.

Club career

St Patrick's Athletic
Born in Dublin, Quinn came through the youth set up of St Patrick's Athletic in the League of Ireland. He made his senior debut in a 2–1 loss to Shamrock Rovers on the 23rd of April 2004, which also proved to be his only senior appearance for the club.

Sheffield United

Quinn signed for Sheffield United in 2005 and he made his first team debut for the Blades in a League Cup win at Shrewsbury Town on 20 September 2005.

Quinn spent some of the 2005–06 season on loan with Milton Keynes Dons and Rotherham United respectively, becoming a fan favourite at The Millers where his performances helped them to avoid relegation.

Quinn made his Premiership debut for the Blades against Charlton Athletic, and could have almost scored within the first 40 seconds of the game. In his second appearance, a match against Aston Villa at Bramall Lane, he did score his first goal for the club. Quinn ended the season by winning the young player of the season award and was rewarded with a new contract. Sheffield United warded off interest allegedly from numerous Championship clubs during the summer 2011 transfer window, with Quinn being made aware of an offer – rejected by Sheffield United – from Blackpool (who also signed Daniel Bogdanović) by his agent. By 9 April 2012, Quinn provided more assists (14) than any other player in League One. He also scored four goals in the 2011–12 season.

Hull City
Quinn joined Championship club Hull City on a three-year contract for an undisclosed fee on 31 August 2012. It was later revealed that Hull City would pay Sheffield United £2,000 per game for his first 50 games, plus a further £100,000 if the Tigers were promoted to the Premier League. On 1 September 2012 at the KC Stadium against Bolton Wanderers, great work from Jay Simpson on the right edge saw him pull the ball back for Quinn, who marked his home debut with a simple finish past Ádám Bogdán from close range. Quinn enjoyed a highly successful first season in East Yorkshire, ending the campaign by winning Hull's Players' Player of the Season award as the Tigers were promoted to the Premier League under new manager Steve Bruce.

On 13 April 2014, he scored Hull's fourth goal in their 5–3 FA Cup semi-final win over Sheffield United at Wembley Stadium. On 17 May 2014 he started in the 2014 FA Cup Final against Arsenal. On 4 May 2015, Quinn scored for Hull City in a 1–3 defeat to Arsenal at the KC Stadium.

Reading
On 30 June 2015, Quinn signed a three-year contract with Reading after his deal with Hull City expired. Quinn scored his first goal for the club in a 2–1 loss to Preston North End on 30 April 2016. Reading announced on 11 May 2018 that Quinn would leave the club at the end of his contract.

Burton Albion
On 22 August 2018, Quinn joined League One club Burton Albion on a short-term deal until January 2019. On 15 January 2021, Quinn joined League Two side Mansfield Town on loan for the remainder of the 2020-21 season.

Mansfield Town
After having finished the season with Mansfield Town on loan, Quinn joined the club on a one-year permanent deal on 14 June 2021. In June 2022, having missed out on promotion in the 2022 play-off Final, Quinn signed a new one-year contract at the club.

International career

Quinn was called up by the Republic of Ireland for the first time as part of the senior squad to face San Marino in the UEFA Euro 2008 qualifier at the Serravalle Stadium on 4 February 2007.

He made his U21 international debut in the 1–0 loss against the Netherlands in Venlo on 27 March. Quinn scored his first international goal in a 3–2 victory against Sweden U-21 in October 2007.

Quinn won his first senior cap on 2 June 2013 when the Republic of Ireland beat Georgia 4–0. He would also go on to win a second cap against World Cup and European Champions Spain.
On 7 September 2014 in Martin O'Neill's first competitive game in charge of Ireland, Quinn started his first competitive game against Georgia alongside Glenn Whelan and James McCarthy in midfield. Ireland won the game 2–1 thanks to a last minute winner by Aiden McGeady. Quinn admitted after the game that there was a "weight lifted off his shoulders" after making his competitive debut. Quinn started in a 1–1 draw against Germany, Quinn was criticised in the media for the German goal for standing off and allowing Toni Kroos the time to shoot and score.

Personal life
Stephen Quinn is the younger brother of former Ipswich Town and Sheffield United midfielder Alan Quinn and the older brother of former fellow Sheffield United midfielder Keith Quinn. His cousin Joe Redmond is also a professional footballer. He is nicknamed Mini Quinny in reference to older brother Alan.

Career statistics

Club

International

Honours
Hull City
Football League Championship runner-up: 2012–13
FA Cup runner-up: 2013–14

Individual
PFA Team of the Year: 2011–12 League One
Sheffield United Player of the Year: 2010–11

References

External links

Ireland profile at Soccerscene

1986 births
Living people
Association footballers from Dublin (city)
Republic of Ireland association footballers
Republic of Ireland under-21 international footballers
Republic of Ireland international footballers
Association football midfielders
St Patrick's Athletic F.C. players
Sheffield United F.C. players
Milton Keynes Dons F.C. players
Rotherham United F.C. players
Hull City A.F.C. players
Reading F.C. players
Burton Albion F.C. players
Mansfield Town F.C. players
League of Ireland players
Premier League players
English Football League players
UEFA Euro 2016 players
People from Clondalkin
Sportspeople from South Dublin (county)
FA Cup Final players